Lorena Patricia Cortez Chávez (born 19 February 1988) is a Peruvian footballer who plays as a defender. She was a member of the Peru women's national team.

International career
Cortez represented Peru at the 2004 South American U-19 Women's Championship. At senior level, she played two Copa América Femenina editions (2006 and 2018).

References

1988 births
Living people
Women's association football defenders
Peruvian women's footballers
Peru women's international footballers
Place of birth missing (living people)